A scout plane is type of surveillance aircraft, usually of single-engined, two or three seats, shipborne type, and used for the purpose of discovering an enemy position and directing artillery. Therefore, a scout plane is essentially a small naval aircraft, as distinguished from a tactical ground observation aircraft, a strategic reconnaissance "spyplane", or a large patrol flying boat.

Scout planes first made their appearances during World War I. Major naval powers, keen on developing the new medium of aerial warfare, converted a number of vessels as seaplane tenders for scouting purpose. Similarly, battleships began to mount short flight decks on top of gun turrets, enabling small fighter-type aircraft to take-off from them; these single-seater "scouts", having no floats to land on and having no landing decks to return to, either had to find dry land for landing, or else had to ditch onto the sea.

After World War I, a more satisfactory (although still clumsy) solution had been found, in which catapults were mounted onto battleships, cruisers and seaplane tenders, used to launch scout planes; these floatplanes or small flying boats would land on water, and then be winched back onto the ships by cranes. Well-known scout planes of these type include the British Supermarine Walrus, the German Arado Ar 196, and the American Curtiss SOC Seagull.

Meanwhile, aircraft carriers also began to appear; these rarely carried dedicated scout planes, but usually combined this function with other types of aircraft, such as dive bombers (hence this type of aircraft was known in the United States Navy as "scout bomber") or torpedo bombers ("torpedo scouts").

While the "traditional" role of scout planes was to spot enemy fleets, during World War II scout planes were essential for battleships and other surface warships during bombardment of land targets, as it was difficult to see an enemy position, even with binoculars. The scout plane, for the U.S., this was usually the Vought OS2U Kingfisher, which would fly over the position, giving the ship a latitude and longitude destination. The ship would then open fire on that area, thereby indirectly attacking the enemy, and allowing ground troops or fighter-bomber aircraft to access the area.

Their extremely long range meant that they could fire over the horizon, and scout planes were needed to spot enemy ships. Seven seaplane scouts were carried on each ship, including four Aichi E13A for long-range reconnaissance, and three Mitsubishi F1Ms for artillery direction. Japan also pioneered the concept of submarine-borne scout planes, with a number of large submarines having waterproof hangars and catapults to carry scout floatplanes during World War II.

During the Cold War the role of the shipborne observation aircraft was taken over by naval helicopters. Although less so in Western navies, the role of providing mid-course update via data-link for long range anti-shipping missiles can be seen as directly akin to the artillery "spotting" missions of old. Without mid-course update it would be impossible to fully utilize the full range of long range missiles such as the Otomat, and P-500 Bazalt.

Due to the advanced technology used by today's cruisers, destroyers, and other surface vessels, and the use of ship-launched UAVs for the same sorts of "spotting" missions in the 21st century, scout planes are no longer needed for long range exchanges.

References

See also

Reconnaissance aircraft